The 2017–18 Minnesota Golden Gophers women's basketball team represented the University of Minnesota during the 2017–18 NCAA Division I women's basketball season. The Golden Gophers, led by fourth-year head coach Marlene Stollings, played their home games at Williams Arena as members of the Big Ten Conference. They finished the season 24–9, 11–5 in Big Ten play to finish in a three-way tie for third place. They defeated Iowa in the quarterfinals of the Big Ten women's tournament before losing to Ohio State in the semifinals. They received at-large bid of the NCAA women's tournament as the No. 7 seed in the Spokane region. There they defeated Green Bay before losing to Oregon in the Second Round.

On April 9, 2018, head coach Marlene Stollings resigned from Minnesota to accept the head coaching job at Texas Tech. She finished with a four-year record of 82–47. On April 12, the school hired the second all-time leading scorer for the Gophers, Lindsay Whalen, as head coach. As part of her contract with the school, Whalen will continue to play for the WNBA's Minnesota Lynx while she is head coach.

Roster

Schedule and results

|-
! colspan="9" style=| Non-conference regular season

|-

|-

|-

|-

|-

|-

|-

|-

|-

|-

|-

|-

|-
! colspan="9" style=|Big Ten conference season

|-

|-

|-

|-

|-

|-

|-

|-

|-

|-

|-

|-

|-

|-

|-

|-
! colspan="9" style=|Big Ten Women's Tournament

|-
! colspan="9" style=|NCAA Women's Tournament

Source

Rankings

See also
2017–18 Minnesota Golden Gophers men's basketball team

References

Minnesota Golden Gophers women's basketball seasons
Minnesota
Minnesota
Minnesota Golden Gophers women's basketball team
Minnesota Golden Gophers women's basketball team